This is a list of museums in Vietnam.

Museums 
Precious Heritage Art Gallery Museum
Can Tho Museum
Museum of Cham Sculpture
Hanoi Contemporary Arts Centre
Hanoi Hilton
Hanoi Museum
Ho Chi Minh City Museum
Ho Chi Minh Museum
Vietnam Press Museum
Hue Museum of Royal Fine Arts
National Museum of Vietnamese History
Museum of Vietnamese History
Nam Định Textile Museum
Nhatranglive
Museum of Sa Huynh Culture
Museum of Trade Ceramics
Vietnam People's Air Force Museum, Hanoi
Vietnam People's Air Force Museum, Ho Chi Minh City
Vietnam Museum of Ethnology
Vietnam National Museum of Fine Arts
Vietnam National Museum of Nature in Hanoi (Bảo tàng thiên nhiên Việt Nam)
Vietnam Military History Museum
Vietnam Museum of Revolution
Vietnamese Women's Museum
War Remnants Museum
Museum of Worldwide Arms
Yersin Museum

See also

List of war museums and monuments in Vietnam
List of museums
Tourism in Vietnam
Culture of Vietnam

References 

Museums
 
Vietnam
Museums
Museums
Vietnam